The Dubai Electricity and Water Authority (DEWA) is a public service infrastructure company that was founded on 1 January 1992 by Sheikh Maktoum bin Rashid Al Maktoum.

History 
DEWA was formed by  merger of the Dubai Electricity Company and the Dubai Water Department that had been operating independently until then. These organizations were established in 1959 by Sheikh Rashid bin Saeed Al Maktoum, the ruler of Dubai at the time. The objective of the state-run company is making available to the people of Dubai an adequate and reliable supply of electricity and water.

As of end of 2019, DEWA employs a workforce of 11,727 employees and provides 915,623 customers with electricity and 816,580 customers with water.

In 2019, DEWA had an installed capacity of 11,400MW of electricity and 470 million imperial gallons of desalinated water per day.

After using conventional gas-fired power plants for most of its history, DEWA now builds the 5GW Mohammed bin Rashid Al Maktoum Solar Park which is known for breaking several cost records for solar power both from phtovoltaics and from concentrated solar power. After installing an initial 13 MW (DC) solar plant as the first phase in 2013, a further 200 MW (AC) seconde phase were contracted from developer ACWA Power in January 2015. The third phase is an 800 MW PV power plant, which was started in the fall of 2015 and was completed by 2020. DEWA plans a 250 MW pumped-storage hydroelectricity at Hatta using 880 million gallons of water 300 meter above a lower dam.

Planned initial public offering 
DEWA has planned to float 18 percent of its issued share capital as public offering listed on the Dubai Financial Market (DFM), the IPO is estimated to $22.6 billion.

Financial performance 
For the year 2022, DEWA has posted a net profit of AED 8 billion.

See also 

Energy in the United Arab Emirates
Solar power in the United Arab Emirates
Sharjah Electricity and Water Authority

References

External links
 

Companies based in Dubai
Electric power in the United Arab Emirates
Government agencies of Dubai
Government-owned companies of the United Arab Emirates
Water management authorities
1992 establishments in the United Arab Emirates